Small Foot or Smallfoot may refer to:

 Smallfoot, a rapid application development toolkit and embedded operating system
 Smallfoot (film), a 2018 animated film
 Small Foot (Gobots), a fictional character from Gobots and Transformers